The 2011–12 season was West Ham Uniteds first season back in the Football League Championship, after being relegated from the Premier League at the conclusion of 2010–11 campaign. They also competed in the League Cup and the FA Cup. It was their first season under Sam Allardyce, who was appointed in May 2011 after the sacking of the club's previous manager, Avram Grant. On 19 May 2012, West Ham gained promotion back to the Premier League at the first attempt, as they won the play-off Final by defeating Blackpool 2–1 at Wembley.

Season summary
Sam Allardyce was appointed as the club's new manager on 1 June 2011, after his predecessor Avram Grant was sacked following the club's relegation with a 3–2 defeat at Wigan Athletic.

For the majority of the season West Ham looked on course for automatic promotion, and even briefly topped the division on 1 March, but eventually finished third, after being beaten to automatic promotion by Southampton on the final day of the season, despite a 2–1 win against Hull City. Failure to win a league game in March saw West Ham overtaken by Reading, who defeated the Hammers 4–2 in a key game at Upton Park, and Southampton. and despite a late rally the team had to settle for a play-off place. West Ham's 13 away wins constituted a club record for any league season. They also recorded the fewest defeats (8) of any team in the Championship this season and had the second best goal difference, but 14 draws saw the club miss out on automatic promotion.

West Ham faced Cardiff City in the semi-finals of the play-offs, with the Hammers comfortably beating the Bluebirds 5–0 on aggregate. West Ham then sealed their promotion back to the Premier League on 19 May 2012, beating Blackpool 2–1 at Wembley with goals from Carlton Cole and Ricardo Vaz Tê. This was West Ham's first appearance at the national stadium since the 1981 League Cup Final.

League table

Squad

Out on loan

Results

Pre-season

Championship

Championship play-offs

Football League Cup

FA Cup

Statistics

Overview

Goalscorers

League position by matchday

Appearances and goals

|-
! colspan=14 style=background:#dcdcdc; text-align:center| Goalkeepers

|-
! colspan=14 style=background:#dcdcdc; text-align:center| Defenders

|-
! colspan=14 style=background:#dcdcdc; text-align:center| Midfielders

|-
! colspan=14 style=background:#dcdcdc; text-align:center| Forwards

|}

Transfers

Summer

In

Out

Winter

In

Out

References

External links
 West Ham United FC Official Website

West Ham United
West Ham United F.C. seasons
West Ham United F.C. season
West Ham United F.C. season